Susan Marie Skibba Brnovich (born June 6, 1968) is a United States district judge of the United States District Court for the District of Arizona.

Biography 

Brnovich earned her Bachelor of Business Administration, Master of Science, and Juris Doctor from the University of Wisconsin–Madison.

Brnovich began her legal career by serving as a prosecutor with the Maricopa County Attorney's Office. During her eight years as a prosecutor, Brnovich tried 49 jury trials and one bench trial. In 2003, she became a commissioner on the Maricopa County Superior Court, where she presided over numerous criminal jury trials over the next five years. Brnovich was appointed by Governor of Arizona Janet Napolitano as a trial court judge in January 2009 and was retained by voters in both 2012 and 2016. As a state judge, Brnovich presided over approximately 100 trials. Her state court service ended in 2018 upon her elevation to the federal judiciary.

Brnovich has been a member of the Federalist Society since 2011.

Federal judicial service 

On January 23, 2018, President Donald Trump announced his intent to nominate Brnovich to an undetermined seat on the United States District Court for the District of Arizona. On January 24, 2018, her nomination was sent to the United States Senate. She was nominated to the seat vacated by Judge Neil V. Wake, who assumed senior status on July 5, 2016. On May 9, 2018, a hearing on her nomination was held before the Senate Judiciary Committee. Her nomination was voted out of committee on June 7, 2018, by voice vote. On October 11, 2018, her nomination was confirmed by voice vote. She received her judicial commission on October 23, 2018.

Personal life 

Brnovich is married to the prior Arizona Attorney General, Mark Brnovich.

Electoral history 

2012

2016

References

External links 
 
 

1968 births
Living people
20th-century American lawyers
21st-century American lawyers
21st-century American judges
American prosecutors
Arizona lawyers
Arizona state court judges
Federalist Society members
Judges of the United States District Court for the District of Arizona
Lawyers from Madison, Wisconsin
Spouses of Arizona politicians
State attorneys
Superior court judges in the United States
United States district court judges appointed by Donald Trump
Wisconsin School of Business alumni
University of Wisconsin Law School alumni
20th-century American women lawyers
21st-century American women lawyers
21st-century American women judges